Histone-lysine N-methyltransferase SETMAR is an enzyme that in humans is encoded by the SETMAR gene.

Function 
SETMAR contains a SET domain that confers its histone methyltransferase activity, on Lys-4 and Lys-36 of Histone H3, both of which are specific tags for epigenetic activation. It has been identified as a repair protein as it mediates dimethylation at Lys-36 at double-strand break locations, a signal enhancing NHEJ repair.

Anthropoid primates, including humans, have a version of the protein fused to a Mariner/Tc1 transposase. This fusion region provides the DNA-binding abilities for the protein as well as some nuclease activity. The transposase activity is lost due to the presence of several inactivating mutations, including the D610N mutation. However, the domesticated transposase domain retains its ability to bind to the mariner repeat elements in the genome. SETMAR has been found to affect the expression and splicing of genes close to or containing mariner repeat elements via its functions in histone methylation. Both the SET, via its methyltransferase activity, and the mariner, with its DNA-binding  and nuclease activities, domains of SETMAR have been shown to act in non-homologous end joining (NHEJ) to repair DNA double strand breaks.

Model organisms 

			
Model organisms have been used in the study of SETMAR function. A conditional knockout mouse line, called Setmartm1a(EUCOMM)Wtsi was generated as part of the International Knockout Mouse Consortium program — a high-throughput mutagenesis project to generate and distribute animal models of disease to interested scientists. Note that the mouse ortholog is does not have the Tc1/mariner ("MAR") fusion; such a fusion is found only in anthropoid primates. Therefore, the knockout mouse is not for SETMAR but only the SET domain of this chimeric fusion protein.

Male and female animals underwent a standardized phenotypic screen to determine the effects of deletion. Twenty five tests were carried out on mutant mice and two significant abnormalities were observed. Homozygous mutant animals of both sex had abnormal retinal pigmentation and morphology, while males also had atypical peripheral blood lymphocyte parameters.

References

Further reading 

 
 
 
 
 
 
 
 
 
 
 

Genes mutated in mice